Muhammad Muhsin Khan (1927 – 14 July 2021) was an Islamic scholar and translator of Afghan origin, who lived in Madinah and served as the Chief of Department of Chest Diseases at the King Faisal Specialist Hospital and Research Center. He translated both the Quran and Sahih Al-Bukhari into English. He was the director of the clinic of Islamic University of Madinah.

Biography
Muhammad Muhsin Khan was born in 1927 in Kasur, British India. His nasab (patronymic) is: Muhammad Muhsin bin Muhi-ud-Din bin Ahmed Al-Essa Al-Khoashki Al-Jamandi Al-Afghani. His grandparents emigrated from Afghanistan in order to escape from war and tribal strifes. He belongs to the Kheshgi Pashtun tribe (arabized as Al-Khoashki) that resides in the valley of Arghistan, Kandahar province Afghanistan, where he completed most of his education.

He received an MBBS degree from the University of the Punjab, and a Diploma of Chest Diseases from the University of Wales. Prior to his studies at the University of Wales, he worked in the university hospital of the University of Lahore. He later worked with Saudi Arabia's Ministry of Health, and then became the director of El-Sadad Hospital for the Chest Diseases. He moved to Madinah, where he served as the Chief of Department of Chest Diseases at the King Faisal Specialist Hospital and Research Center. He later became the director of the clinic of the Islamic University of Madinah.

Muhsin Khan died on Wednesday 14 July 2021 in Madinah, Saudi Arabia. His funeral prayers were offered in Masjid al-Haram and he was buried in Jannat al-Baqi'.

Works
The Translation of the Meanings Of Sahih Al-Bukhari
Summarized Sahih Al-Bukhari
Noble Qur'an, co-authored with Muhammad Taqi-ud-Din al-Hilali.
Understanding Ramadan

See also
Muhammad bin Jamil Zeno
Saleh Al-Fawzan

References

External links
Biography of Dr. Muhsin Khan
Read translation of Quran by Dr. Muhsin Khan

Pashtun people
1927 births
2021 deaths
Alumni of the University of Wales
Translators of the Quran into English
People from Kasur District
University of the Punjab alumni
Burials at Jannat al-Baqī